Jesse and Ira Tuthill House is a historic home located at Mattituck in Suffolk County, New York. It was built in two stages, 1799 and 1841.  The original two-room house was incorporated as a -story wing for the larger 2-story, nine-room house.  The final 1841 house is a -story residence with a modestly pitched gable roof with a wide frieze running beneath the roof eave.

It was added to the National Register of Historic Places in 2006.

The Mattituck-Laurel Historical Society owns the 1799 Jesse Tuthill House and 1841 Ira Tuthill House and operates them as period historic house museums.

References

External links
 Mattituck-Laurel Historical Society

Houses on the National Register of Historic Places in New York (state)
Houses completed in 1841
Houses in Suffolk County, New York
Museums in Suffolk County, New York
Historic house museums in New York (state)
National Register of Historic Places in Suffolk County, New York